Khargone district, formerly known as West Nimar district, is a district of Madhya Pradesh state in central India. The district lies in the Nimar region and is part of the Indore Division. The district headquarters is the city of Khargone, which lies south of the Indore metropolis, the headquarters of Indore district.

History
In ancient times, the Haihayas of Mahishmati (present-day Maheshwar) ruled the region. In the early medieval ages, the area was under the Paramaras of Malwa and the Ahirs of Asirgarh. In the late medieval ages, the area was under the Malwa Sultanate of Mandu.

In 1531, Gujarat sultan Bahadur Shah brought this area under his control. In 1562, Akbar annexed this territory along with the whole Malwa to Mughal empire. In 1740, Marathas under the Peshwa brought the area under their control. In 1778, the Peshwa distributed this territory to the Maratha rulers: Holkars of Indore, Sindhias of Gwalior, and Ponwars of Dhar.

After the independence and merging of the Princely states into the Union of India in 1948, this territory became West Nimar district of Madhya Bharat. Khargone district had been part of the Nerbudda (Narmada) Division of the Central Provinces and Berar, which became the state of Madhya Bharat (later Madhya Pradesh) after India's independence in 1947. On 1 November 1956, this district became part of the newly formed state of Madhya Pradesh. On 25 May 1998, West Nimar district was bifurcated into two districts: Khargone and Barwani.

Geography
The district is situated between 21°22' and 22°35' north latitudes and 74°25' and 76°14' east longitudes. The district is surrounded by the districts of Dhar, Indore, and Dewas to the north; Jalgaon district of Maharashtra state to the south; Khandwa and Burhanpur districts to the east; and Barwani district to the west.

Economy
Khargone's economy is dependent on agriculture, with several other industries in the cities of Nimrani and Barwaha. The major cash crops of the Khargone district are cotton, soybean, and chilli pepper.

The district is India's biggest cotton-producing region. There are various cotton processing units (spinning) in the cooperative sector and private sector. One of the major spinning units is the cooperative Jawaharlal Nehru Sahakari Soot Mill, situated on Julwania Road. The famous Sendhwa cotton hub is just 70 km from Khargone city.

The red chilli pepper is exported abroad. A famous mandi of chilli at Bedia is located about 50 km from Khargone city.

Divisions
The district is divided into two sub-divisions, Barwaha and Khargone, which are further divided into 9 tehsils. The Barwaha sub-division has 3 big tehsils (Barwaha, Maheshwar, and Kasrawad) which cover 50% of the area of the Khargone district, while the Khargone sub-division has 6 small tensils (Khargone, Gogawan, Segaon, Bhagwanpura, Bhikangaon, and Jhirnya) which cover the remaining 50% of the area.

Khargone city is the administrative headquarters of the district. Other towns include Maheshwar, Kasrawad, Segaon, Bhagwanpura, Jhirnya, Bhikangaon, Gogawan, and Barwaha. Maheshwar is a tourist destination due to it being the former capital of the Haihayas and the Holkars of Indore.

The district consists of six Vidhan Sabha constituencies: Bhikangaon, Barwaha, Maheshwar, Kasrawad, Khargone, and Bhagwanpura. Bhikangaon and Barwaha are a part of the Khandwa Lok Sabha constituency, while the rest are part of the Khargone Lok Sabha constituency.

Demographics

According to the 2011 census, Khargone district has a population of 1,873,046, roughly equal to the population of Kosovo or the US state of West Virginia. It ranks 252nd out of the 640 districts in India in terms of population. Its population growth rate over the decade 2001–2011 was 22.81%. West Nimar has a sex ratio of 963 females for every 1000 males, and a literacy rate of 63.98%. 15.96% of the population lives in urban areas. Scheduled Castes and Scheduled Tribes make up 11.16% and 38.98% of the population, respectively.

Languages

At the time of the 2011 census, 51.80% of the population in the district spoke Nimadi, 17.38% Hindi, 11.10% Bareli, 6.74% Bhilali, 6.43% Bhili, 1.98% Urdu, 1.81% Banjari, 0.61% Gujarati, and 0.43% Marathi as their first language.

Nimadi is the most spoken language in west Nimar. Bareli Palya, a Bhil language, has approximately 10,000 speakers, centered in Madhya Pradesh; Bareli Rathwi, another Bhil language, has approximately 64,000 speakers, written in the Devanagari script; and Bhilali has 1,150,000 speakers.

Villages 
 

Surpala

References

External links

Official "Khargone district" website in Hindi language

 
Districts of Madhya Pradesh
1948 establishments in India